The 4th award ceremony of Feroz Awards was held at the Palacete de los Duques de Pastrana in Madrid, on January 23, 2017. It was hosted by actor Antonio de la Torre and aired on #0. Awards recognizing television productions and documentary films were handed for the first time.

Winners and nominees
The nominees were announced on December 1, 2016.

Film

Television

Non competitive awards
 Feroz de Honor: Narciso Ibáñez Serrador
 Premio Especial: The Death of Louis XIV
 Best Documentary Film:

See also
31st Goya Awards

References

Feroz Awards
2017 in Madrid
January 2017 events in Spain